Coeymans Creek is a  tributary of the Hudson River in Albany County, New York in the United States.

The creek originates as the continuation of Onesquethaw Creek, which starts near Clarksville, in the Helderberg Mountains.

History
O-nis'-ke-thau Creek is also called Coeymans Creek. There was a hamlet of this name in New Scotland as well as Oniskethau flats and mountain. It is said to have been an early Native American name meaning cornfields.

Tributaries
 Mosher Brook
 Onesquethaw Creek
 Feuri Spruyt (Feuri-Sprayt Kill), a small stream in the north part of Coeymans, disappears, and flows for half a mile in a subterranean passage, coming to the surface again in New Scotland.

See also
List of rivers of New York
Onesquethaw Valley Historic District

References

Rivers of Albany County, New York
Rivers of New York (state)
Tributaries of the Hudson River